This is a list of saints, blesseds, venerables, and Servants of God from Africa, as recognized by the Catholic Church or other Christian denominations. These people were born, died, or lived their religious life in any of the states or territories of Africa.

Before the Arab Conquest

In the first centuries of the Catholic Church, Africa produced many of her leading lights.  The Catholic presence in Africa was weakened by the schism following the Council of Chalcedon which resulted in the separation between the Catholic and Coptic Orthodox Church, and even more so by the rise of Islam.  Following the Arab conquest of northern Africa, the Catholic Church was largely absent from the continent before modern times, although the Coptic, and later Ethiopic, Orthodox Churches remained.  The following are some of the notable saints from the first to seventh centuries, though it is a very incomplete list.

Popes

Three of the early popes were either from Africa themselves or children of African immigrants to Rome.  All three were from this time period and are traditionally considered saints.  They are:
 Pope Victor I (r. 189–199)
 Pope Miltiades (r. 311–314)
 Pope Gelasius I (r. 492–496)

Doctors

Three of the thirty-five Doctors of the Church were from Africa, all of them from this time period.  They are:
 Augustine of Hippo, from present-day Algeria
 Athanasius of Alexandria, from present-day Egypt
 Cyril of Alexandria, from present-day Egypt

Writers and theologians

Many of the early writers and theologians had connections with Africa.  A partial list would include:
 Mark the Evangelist, author of the Gospel that bears his name and founder of the Patriarchate of Alexandria
 Apollos, may be author of the Epistle to Hebrews
 Ammon the Abbot
 Anatolius of Laodicea, of Egypt
 Aurelius, of Tunisia
 Clement of Alexandria, author of several works, whose cult in the Latin Rite has been suppressed
 Cyprian of Carthage, author of several works
 Didymus the Blind
 Fulgentius of Ruspe, of Tunisia
 Isidore of Pelusium, author of several letters
 Optatus, author against Donatism
 Pierius
 Possidius, author of a life of Augustine of Hippo
 Quodvultdeus

Others

In addition to the categories above, these first centuries gave the Church many other saints, among them:

 Abraham the Poor, of Egypt
 Abraham of Alexandria, of Egypt
 Achillas of Alexandria, of Egypt
 Adrian of Canterbury, of North Africa
 Aizan and Sazan, of Ethiopia
 Alexander of Alexandria, of Egypt
 Alypius of Thagaste, of Algeria
 Ammon the Martyr and companions, of Egypt
 Anastasius Sinaita, of Egypt
 Anthony the Great, of Egypt
 Apollonia of Alexandria and companions, of Egypt
 Arcadius of Mauretania, of Algeria
 Arethas, Ruma and companions, of Ethiopia
 Armogastes and Saturus, of Tunisia
 Athanasia and Andronicus, of Egypt
 Bessarion of Egypt
 Caecilius, spiritual father to Cyprian of Carthage, of Tunisia
 Cassian of Tangier, of Morocco
 Catherine of Alexandria, of Egypt
 Cerbonius, of North Africa
 Crispina, of Algeria
 Cucuphas, of Tunisia
 Damian of Alexandria, of Egypt
 Demetrius of Alexandria, of Egypt
 Deogratias of Carthage, of Tunisia
 Denise, Dativa, Leontia, Tertius, Emilianus, Boniface, Majoricus, and Servus, of Tunisia
 Dionysius of Alexandria, of Egypt
 Donatian and companions, of North Africa
 Epenetus of Carthage, of Tunisia
 Eugenius of Carthage, of Tunisia
 Fabius, of Algeria
 Felix of Abbir, Cyprian of Unizzibir, and companions, of Libya
 Felix of Hadrumetum, of Tunisia
 Felix of Thibiuca, of Tunisia
 Frumentius, of Ethiopia
 Gaudiosus of Naples, of Tunisia
 Isidore of Alexandria, of Egypt
 Isidore of Chios, of Egypt
 Isidore of Scété, of Egypt
 John of Egypt, of Egypt
 Julia of Corsica, of Tunisia
 Kaleb of Axum (Elesbaan), of Ethiopia
 Lucius of Cyrene, of Libya
 Marciana of Mauretania, of Algeria
 Macarius of Alexandria, of Egypt
 Macarius of Egypt, of Egypt
 Marcellinus of Carthage, of Tunisia
 Marcellinus, Vincent, and Domninus, of North Africa
 Marcellus of Tangier, of Morocco
 Marianus, James, and companions, of Algeria
 The Martyrs of the Plague of Cyprian in Alexandria, Egypt
 The Martyrs of Utica, of Tunisia
 Mary of Egypt, of Egypt
 Maurice and the Theban Legion, of Egypt
 Maximilian of Tebessa, in Algeria
 Matthew I of Alexandria, of Egypt
 Monica of Hippo, of Algeria
 Moses the Black, of Egypt
 Nabor and Felix, of Morocco
 Nemesian and companions, of Algeria
 Nemesion and companions, of Egypt
 Onuphrius, of Egypt
 Orsiesius of Tabenna, of Egypt
 Pachomius the Great, founder of monasticism, of Egypt
 Pambo, of Egypt
 Pantaenus, of Egypt
 Paphnutius the Ascetic, of Egypt
 Paphnutius of Thebes, of Egypt
 Paul of Thebes, of Egypt
 Perpetua, Felicity, and companions, in Tunisia
 Peter of Alexandria, of Egypt
 Poemon, of Egypt
 Quintian of Rodez, of Tunisia
 Restituta, of Tunisia
 Saizana, of Ethiopia
 Sarmata, of Egypt
 Saturninus, Dativus, Victoria, and Companions, of Tunisia
 Serapion of Thmuis, of Egypt
 Shenoute, of Egypt
 Simon of Cyrene, of Libya
 Speratus and companions, of Tunisia
 Thaïs, of Egypt
 Theodorus of Tabennese, of Egypt
 Timothy the Reader and his wife Maura, of Egypt
 Typasius, of Algeria
 Valerian of Abbenza, of Tunisia
 Victor Maurus, of Morocco
 Victor of Utica, of Tunisia
 Victorian, Frumentius and Companions, of Tunisia
 Zeno of Verona, of Algeria

Modern times

It would be difficult to say who the first saint to be associated with Africa after the Arab conquest would be.  Francis of Assisi famously went on a mission to Egypt in 1219.  Berardo, Ottone, Pietro, Accursio, Adiuto, martyrs in Morocco (1220).  Daniel Fasanella, Samuele, Angelo, Leone, Niccolò, Ugolino, Domno, martyrs in Morocco (1227).  Louis IX of France died in Tunisia en route from the Holy Land in 1270.  But after the canonization of saints came to be reserved to the papacy around AD 1000, and especially after the establishment of the Congregation of Rites in 1588, the list of official saints with African connections is more clear.

List of saints

The following is the list of saints, including the year in which they were canonized and the country or countries with which they are associated.
 Serapion of Algiers, Mercedarian religious and martyr (1728, Algeria)
 Anthony Mary Claret, Claretian bishop (1950, Canary Islands)
 The Martyrs of Uganda (1964, Uganda). They include:
 Charles Lwaanga
 Matthias Muluumba
 Andrew Kaggwa
 Athanasius Bazzekuketta
 Gonzaga Goonza
 Noe Mawaggali
 Luke Baanabakiintu
 James Buzaabalyaawo
 Gyaviira Musoke
 Ambrosio Kibuuka
 Anatoli Kiriggwajjo
 Achilles Kiwanuka
 Kizito
 Mbaga Tuziinde
 Mugagga Lubowa
 Joseph Mukasa
 Adolphus Ludigo
 Bruno Seruunkuuma
 John Mary Muzeeyi
 Dennis Ssebuggwaawo Wasswa
 Ponsiano Ngoondwe
 Mukasa Kiriwawaanvu
 Justin de Jacobis, Lazarist Bishop (1975, Ethiopia and Eritrea)
 Josephine Bakhita, Canossian religious (2000, Sudan)
 Peter of Saint Joseph Betancur, layman (2002, Canary Islands)
 Daniel Comboni, bishop (2003, Sudan)
 Jacques Berthieu, Jesuit priest and martyr (2012, Madagascar)
 José de Anchieta, Jesuit priest (2014, Canary Islands)

List of blesseds
 Benedict Daswa, layman and martyr (South Africa)
 Agathange de Vendome, Capuchin priest and martyr (Ethiopia)
 Isidore Bakanja, layman and martyr (Democratic Republic of Congo)
 Jan Beyzym, Jesuit priest (Madagascar)
 Lucien Botovasoa, layman and martyr (Madagascar)
 Cassien de Nantes, Capuchin priest and martyr (Ethiopia)
 Lorenza Diaz Bolanos, Daughter of Charity martyred in Spain (Canary Islands)
 Michele Fasoli, Franciscan priest and martyr (Ethiopia)
 Charles de Foucauld, religious and martyr (Algeria)
 Joseph Gérard, priest (Lesotho)
 Jildo Irwa, layman and martyr (Uganda)
 Jacques-Désiré Laval, Spiritan priest (Mauritius)
 Martyrs of Algeria, Trappists and martyrs (Algeria)
 Samuele Marzorati, Franciscan priest and martyr (Ethiopia)
 Eliza Liduina Meneguzzi, Salesian sister (Ethiopia)
 Ghebre Michael, priest and martyr (Ethiopia)
 Marie-Clémentine Anuarite Nengapeta, Holy Family sister and martyr (Democratic Republic of Congo)
 Daudi Okelo, layman and martyr (Uganda)
 Raphael Rafiringa, De La Salle brother (Madagascar)
 Victoire Rasoamanarivo, laywoman (Madagascar)
 Jean-Bernard Rousseau, De La Salle brother (Reunion)
 Leonella Sgorbati, Consolata Missionary sister and martyr (Somalia)
 Francesco Spoto, Missionary Servant of the Poor priest and martyr (Democratic Republic of Congo)
 Irene Stefani, Consolata Missionary sister (Kenya)
 Cyprian Michael Iwene Tansi, Cistercian priest (Nigeria)
 Maria Caterina Troiani, Franciscan sister (Egypt)
 Liberat Weiss, Franciscan priest and martyr (Ethiopia)
 Francesco Zirano, Franciscan priest and martyr (Algeria)

List of venerables
 Zeinab Alif, Poor Clare sister (Sudan)
 Jerzy Ciesielski, layman (Egypt)
 Felix Mary Ghebreamlak, Cistercian priest (Eritrea)
 Edel Quinn, laywoman (Kenya)
 Maria Teresa Scandola, Comboni sister (South Sudan)
 Mary Jane Wilson, Franciscan sister (Madeira)
 Luigi Lo Verde, professed cleric of the Conventual Franciscans (Tunisia)
 Martyrs of Kikwit, Sisters of the Poor and martyrs (Democratic Republic of Congo)
 Luigia Rosina Rondi, S.d.P.I.P.
 Alessandra Ghilardi, S.d.P.I.P.
 Anna Maria Sorti, S.d.P.I.P.
 Teresa Belleri, S.d.P.I.P.
 Celeste Maria Ossoli, S.d.P.I.P.
 Maria Rosa Zorza, S.d.P.I.P.
 Augustus Tolton, former slave and first openly African-American Catholic priest
 Henriette DeLille, founder of the Sisters of the Holy Family, the second order of Black nuns in the United States
 Pierre Toussaint, former slave and notable African-American philanthropist in New York City

List of Servants of God
 John Bradburne, layperson of the Archdiocese of Harare; member of the Secular Franciscans; martyr (Zimbabwe)
 Teresa Chikaba, West African nun
 Peter Porekuu Dery, Archbishop of Tamale (Ghana)
 Stéphanos II Ghattas, cardinal (Egypt)
 Mariano Gichohi and 20 Companions, martyrs under the Mau Mau (Kenya)
 Marianno Wachira and 26 Companions (d. 1952–1955), laypeople from the Archdioceses of Nyeri and Nairobi along with the Dioceses of Murang’a and Meru; Catechumens; professed religious of the Consolata Missionary Sisters and the Sisters of Mary Immaculate of Nyeri; martyrs (Kenya)
 Daniel George Hyams and Domitilla Maria Rota Hyams, married laypersons of the Archdiocese of Johannesburg (South Africa)
 Michel Kayoya and 43 Companions, martyrs (Burundi)
 Bernardo de Monroy and two companions, Trinitarian priests and martyrs (Algeria)
 Vivian Uchechi Ogu, child of the Diocese of Mbaise; martyr (Nigeria)
 Maurice Michael Otunga, cardinal (Kenya)
 Cyprien and Daphrose Rugamba and six companions, martyrs (Rwanda)
 Bernadeta Mbawala, nun (Tanzania)
 Julius Kambarage Nyerere, first president of Tanzania
 Mario Bortoletto, priest of the Diocese of Treviso; Fidei Donum Missionary in the Diocese of Ebolowa; associate of the Pontifical Institute for Foreign Missions (Cameroon)
 Luisa Mabalane Mafo and 22 Lay Companions from the Catechetical Center of Guiua, married catechists, catechumens, young laypersons and children of the Diocese of Imhanbane; martyrs (Mozambique)
 Sergio Sorgon (Sergio of Saint Joseph) (1938–1985), professed priest of the Discalced Carmelites (Madagascar)
 Teresa Kearney (Mary Kevin) (1875–1957), founder of the Little Sisters of Saint Francis and the Franciscan Missionary Sisters for Africa (Uganda)
 Manuel Costa de los Ríos (prob. 1604–1686), layperson of the Archdiocese of Mercedes-Luján, custodian of Our Lady of Luján (Angola)
 Christophe Munzihirwa Mwene Ngabo (1926–1996), professed priest of the Jesuits; Archbishop of Bukavu (Democratic Republic of Congo)
 Jeremy Joyner White, layperson of the Personal Prelature of the Holy Cross and Opus Dei (Nigeria)
 Aloÿs Kobès, professed priest of the Congregation of the Holy Spirit (Spiritians); apostolic vicar of Senegambia; founder of the Daughters of the Holy Heart of Mary and the Brothers of Saint Joseph (Senegal)
 Floribert Bwana Chui bin Kositi (1981–2007), layperson of the Archdiocese of Goma; member of the Saint Egidio Community; martyr (Democratic Republic of Congo)
 Declan O'Toole (1971–2002), priest of the Mill Hill Missionaries; martyr (Uganda)
 Giosuè dei Cas (1880–1932), professed religious of the Comboni Missionaries of the Heart of Jesus (South Sudan)
 Manuel Armindo de Lima and 3 Companions (Maria Adriano Abílio, Maria do Carmo Bartolomeu Simões, Joveta Paulino) (d. 1982), priest of the Missionary Society of the Good News; laypersons of the Diocese of Viana; postulant of the Mercedarian Sisters of Charity; catechist (Angola)
 Gabriel Gonsum Ganaka (1937–1999), Archbishop of Jos (Nigeria)
 Göbou Yaza (d. 1928?), young layperson of the Diocese of N’Zérékoré; catechumen; martyr (Guinea)
 Franziska May (Reinolda) (1901–1981), professed religious of the Missionary Benedictine Sisters of Tutzing (South Africa)
 Robert Naoussi (ca. 1940–1970), layperson of the Archdiocese of Douala (Cameroon)
 Alexandre Toé (1967–1996), professed priest of the Camillians (Burkina Faso)
 Aloysius Ngobya (1896-1986), priest of the Masaka Diocese (Uganda)
 Amedeo Byabali (1908-1979), nun of the Daughters of Mary, Masaka. (Uganda)
 Julia Greeley, philanthropist and Secular Franciscan
 Thea Bowman, famed liturgist and Black nun from Mississippi
 Mary Elizabeth Lange, first known African-American nun and founder of the Oblate Sisters of Providence, the first order of Black nuns in the United States
 Angelo Graziani, professed priest, Capuchin Franciscans (Angola)
 Henri de Solages, priest and apostolic prefect of Bourbon (Madagascar)

Other proposed causes

Others have been proposed for beatification, and may have active groups supporting their causes. These include:
 Anna Ali, religious in the order of The Most Holy Eucharist and reported mystic. (Kenya) The bishop of the Catholic Diocese of Eldoret has appointed a task force to investigate the life of Anna Ali. Hundreds of pilgrims visit her burial place every year to commemorate the nun who is reported to have received messages from Jesus for 25 years and to have photographed him.

See also

 Blessed
 Congregation for the Causes of Saints
 List of Algerian saints
 List of Central American and Caribbean Saints
 List of Christian saints of Algeria
 List of American saints and beatified people
 List of Mexican Saints
 List of Saints from Oceania
 Roman Catholic saints of Canada
 Roman Catholicism in Africa
 Saint
 Servant of God
 Venerable

References

Citations

Sources 

 "Hagiography Circle"
 

Africa
Saints
Catholic Church in Africa

Africa
Africa
Africa